SIMUL - i.e. Système Intégré de Modélisation mULti-dimensionelle - is an econometric tool for the multidimensional (multi-sectoral and multi-regional) modelling. It allows to implement easily multidimensional econometric models according to their reduced form  - where X and Y are two economic variables, r and b (resp.) denote the region and the branch (resp.) and where  is the residual.

It has been initially developed in the middle of the 90's inside the GAMA Team of the Professor Raymond Courbis at the University of Paris 10 during the project of multi-regional and multi-sectoral national models of REGILINK (R.Courbis, 1975, 1979, 1981).

SIMUL 3.2 

Since 2003, SIMUL release 3.2 has been developed independently from the REGILINK models. It can always run them but not only.

The conception of SIMUL 3.2 was inspired by a software used during a long time in GAMA Team, the SIMSYS software, developed by M.C.McCracken and C.A.Sonnen. SIMUL 3.2 is a tool for preparing, estimating and running dynamic, multi-sectoral and multi-regional models. It has been developed in Turbo-Pascal and needs it during the working sessions. The user implement the econometric models into a "natural language" the 
SIMUL 3.2 translates, compiles and runs it according to a Code generation process.

SIMUL 3.2 has been applied to French labor market analysis.

SIMUL 3.2 is freely downloadable at the Econpapers website

Footnotes

References

 Almon C., (1991), "The INFORUM approach to interindustry modeling", Economic Systems Research, 3(1), pp. 1–7.
 Brillet J.L., (1994), Modélisation économétrique - Principes et techniques, Paris, Economica, Coll.Économie et statistiques avancées, 196 p. + le logiciel Soritec Sampler.
 Buda R., (2010), Modélisation multi-dimensionnelle et analyse multi-régionale de l'économie française, Thèse pour le Doctorat de Sciences économiques soutenue le 23 novembre, Université de Paris-Ouest Nanterre-La Défense, 654 p. 
 Buda R., (2013), "SIMUL 3.2: An Econometric Tool for Multidimensional Modelling", Computational Economics, 41(4), pp. 517–524.  
 Buda R., (2015), "Data Checking and Econometric Software Development: A Technique of Traceability by Fictive Data Encoding", Computational Economics, 46(2), pp. 325–357. 
 Courbis R., (1975), "Le modèle REGINA, modèle de développement national, régional et urbain de l'économie française", Économie Appliquée, 28(2-3).
 Courbis R., (1979), "Le Modèle REGINA, modèle de développement national, régional et urbain de l’économie française" in R.Courbis (Ed.), Modèles régionaux et modèles régionaux-nationaux, Paris, Cujas, Travaux du Gama, pp. 87–102.
 Courbis R., (1981), "La construction de modèles multinationaux : problèmes méthodologiques", in R.Courbis (Ed.), Commerce international et modèles multinationaux – Actes du IIIè colloque international d'Econométrie appliquée, Coll.Travaux du GAMA, 3, Paris, Cujas, pp. 243–247.
 Courbis R. & Sok H., (1983), "Le modèle ANAIS, un modèle intersectoriel détaillé de l'économie française", Prévision et Analyse économique (Cahiers du GAMA), 4(2), juin, pp. 73–101.
 McCracken M.C. & Sonnen C.A., (1972), A system for large econometric models: management, estimation, and simulation, in Proceedings of the Association for Computing Machinery Annual Conference, August 1972, Association for Computing Machinery.
 Peterson W., (1987), "Computer Software for a Large Econometric Model", in T.Barker & W.Peterson (Eds.), The Cambridge Multisectoral Dynamic Model of the British Economy, Cambridge, Cambridge University Press, pp. 105–121.

Econometrics software
Windows-only software